Matthew Wilkie Childers (born December 3, 1978) is an American former professional baseball pitcher.

Career

Childers spent the 2007 season with the Phillies' Triple-A affiliate, the Ottawa Lynx of the International League. He was re-signed by the Phillies on December 7, 2007. In 2008, he played for the Phillies' Triple-A affiliate, the Lehigh Valley IronPigs becoming a free agent at the end of the season. In December 2008, he signed with the Tohoku Rakuten Golden Eagles in Japan.

Personal
He is the brother of Jason Childers.

References

External links

Matt Childers' MILB Biography

1978 births
Living people
American expatriate baseball players in Canada
American expatriate baseball players in Japan
Atlanta Braves players
Baseball players from Georgia (U.S. state)
Beloit Snappers players
Columbus Clippers players
Helena Brewers players
High Desert Mavericks players
Huntsville Stars players
Indianapolis Indians players
Lehigh Valley IronPigs players
Major League Baseball pitchers
Milwaukee Brewers players
Mudville Nine players
Nippon Professional Baseball pitchers
Ottawa Lynx players
People from Douglas, Georgia
Richmond Braves players
Tohoku Rakuten Golden Eagles players
Trenton Thunder players